Fissurella gaillardi is a species of sea snail, a marine gastropod mollusk in the family Fissurellidae, the keyhole limpets. It occurs in Cape Verde.

Description
The size of the shell attains 7 mm.

Distribution
This marine species occurs off the Cape Verdes.

References

 Salvat, F., 1967. Campagne de la Calypso aux Iles du Cap Vert (1959). 8. Mollusques. Introduction. - Fissurellidae. Annales de l'Institut Océanographique 45(2): 19-31
 Rolán E., 2005. Malacological Fauna From The Cape Verde Archipelago. Part 1, Polyplacophora and Gastropoda.

Fissurellidae
Gastropods of Cape Verde
Gastropods described in 1967